Hasanabad-e Emam Jomeh (also Romanized as Ḩasanābād-e Emām Jom‘eh; also known as Ḩasanābād) is a village in Mazul Rural District, in the Central District of Nishapur County, Razavi Khorasan Province, Iran. At the 2006 census, its population was 137, in 31 families.

References 

Populated places in Nishapur County